Zupan or Župan is a South-Slavic surname. Notable people with this surname include:

Antonijo Zupan, Croatian footballer 
Branko Zupan, Slovenian footballer and manager
Dim Zupan,  Slovene children's writer
Dragan Župan, Croatian footballer 
Jure Zupan, Slovene politician, Minister of Science and High Education (2004-2007)
Mark Zupan, American academic
Mark Zupan, American wheelchair rugby player
Marty Zupan, President Emeritus of the Institute for Humane Studies
Matjaž Zupan,  Slovenian former jumper
Miha Zupan, Slovene basketball player
Romana Župan,  Croatian sports sailor
Teja Zupan,  Slovenian swimmer
Vitomil Zupan, Slovene literate 
Zdravko Zupan, Yugoslav comic book creator and historian

South Slavic-language surnames